Sinks Grove is an unincorporated community in Monroe County, West Virginia, United States. Sinks Grove is located on West Virginia Route 3, north of Union. Sinks Grove has a post office with ZIP code 24976.

The "sinks" in Sinks Grove refers to the many dolines or sinkholes throughout the community.  Monroe County was once called "The Land of Sinks" for this effect of its heavily karstic geology.

Sinks Grove is part of the Second Creek watershed, draining into the Greenbrier River and then into the New River.

References

External links
 Sinks Grove Community photos

Unincorporated communities in Monroe County, West Virginia